"The Chemicals Between Us" is a song by alternative band Bush. It was released on 14 September 1999 as the lead single from the band's third album The Science of Things (1999). The song was featured in the TV series Charmed.

Lyrics and style
Gavin Rossdale described the song as being "all about the differences and distances between people." He also said the song was about misunderstanding and not being able to communicate. He said, "I was thinking the chemicals between us would be when things aren't going so good and you're in that lonely bed with that person and you're not communicating."

The song is unique among most other singles by the band due to its numerous electronic elements as well as an almost dancey percussion. However, it also bears a prominent hard rock guitar riff throughout.

Music video
The song's music video (directed by Stéphane Sednaoui), which was filmed in late August 1999 in Los Angeles, was played predominantly on the music channels, MTV, MTV2, and VH1.

Gavin Rossdale on the video:
  
"Thinking about it, the most extravagant thing was my last video ('The Chemicals Between Us')- that was fucking extravagant. I think the next video I do I'm just going to get a pile of money and burn it, KLF style. I might as well just cut to the chase."

The music video begins with Bush performing in an alley with a white monolith beside them, then Rossdale comes inside the monolith in a white background surrounded by a Japanese-inspired island. Later, the scene becomes interspersed with Rossdale doing karate blindfolded and Parsons doing martial arts as well. The video ends with the band entering the monolith.

Commercial performance
It spent five non-consecutive weeks at number one on the U.S. Alternative Songs chart and peaked on the Billboard Hot 100 at number 67 on 4 December 1999. The song would eventually become Bush's last major worldwide hit before their 2002 breakup.

Track listing 
UK Enhanced CD Single 4972222
 "The Chemicals Between Us" (Radio Edit) – 3:10
 "The Chemicals Between Us" (Super Collider Vapour Version) – 10:02
 "The Chemicals Between Us" (CD-ROM Video) – 3:38

UK CD Single 4972232
 "The Chemicals Between Us" – 3:37
 "Homebody" – 4:22
 "Letting the Cables Sleep (Original Demo)" – 4:36

AUS CD Single 4972132
 "The Chemicals Between Us" – 3:37
 "Homebody" – 4:22
 "The Chemicals Between Us" [Super Collider Vapour Version] – 10:02
 "The Chemicals Between Us" [CD-Rom Video] – 3:37

AUS Promo CD Single 4971442 (Custom Made Printed Plastic Sleeve)
 "The Chemicals Between Us [Radio Edit]" – 3:06

Charts

References

External links
 Bush Fansite

1999 songs
1999 singles
Bush (British band) songs
Music videos directed by Stéphane Sednaoui
Songs written by Gavin Rossdale
Electronic rock songs
Interscope Records singles
Trauma Records singles